Alistair Campbell (12 December 1907 – 5 February 1974) was a British academic who was Rawlinson and Bosworth Professor of Anglo-Saxon, University of Oxford, and Fellow of Pembroke College, Oxford, from October 1963 until his death. He was the editor of editions of the Old English poem "Battle of Brunanburh", Æthelweard's Chronicon and Æthelwulf's De abbatibus. He was the author of Old English Grammar (Oxford: Clarendon Press, 1959 ). He translated the mediaeval Latin text, Encomium Emmae Reginae, into modern English for the first time, published in 1949. This was reprinted in 1998 by Cambridge University Press, with a supplementary introduction from Simon Keynes.

Campbell first drew the distinction between the classical and hermeneutic styles of late Roman and early medieval Latin.

References

Sources

1907 births
1974 deaths
Alumni of Balliol College, Oxford
Rawlinson and Bosworth Professors of Anglo-Saxon
Fellows of Pembroke College, Oxford
Anglo-Saxon studies scholars
20th-century British historians